Mehdi Bounou (born 2 May 1997) is a Belgian professional footballer who is currently playing for Patro Eisden Maasmechelen in the Belgian First Amateur Division.

Career
He made his professional debut for OH Leuven on 8 January 2017, being in the starting lineup in the away match against Union SG. Following the 2016-17 season, he was released to Heist.

References 

1997 births
Living people
Belgian footballers
Association football midfielders
Oud-Heverlee Leuven players
K.S.K. Heist players
S.C. Eendracht Aalst players
K. Patro Eisden Maasmechelen players
Challenger Pro League players